Yolanda Hamilton may refer to:

 Yolanda Hamilton (The Young and the Restless)
 Yolanda Hamilton (footballer) (born 1987), Jamaican footballer